Happy's Pizza is an American regional chain of restaurants, serving pizza, ribs, chicken, seafood, sandwiches, pasta and salad.

History 
The first Happy's Pizza restaurant was opened by Happy Asker in 1994 on the east side of Detroit.  From 2006 to early 2008, the chain doubled in size and reached 27 locations.

Now the chain has more than 65 locations in Michigan, Nevada, California and Ohio. The pizzerias are known for their granite counter tops, Venetian plaster on their walls and the neon signs in and outside of the building.

Service of otherwise unserved areas
The company makes a point of opening stores and offering delivery services in areas where other pizza places will not. Happy's Pizza started with one restaurant in Detroit, and grew to a large pizza restaurant chain.

Fraud convictions
In 2010, federal agents raided the company's headquarters. On July 16, 2013, Happy Asker and five other shareholders were indicted on counts of fraud and tax evasion. The Office of the United States Attorney for the Eastern District of Michigan alleged Asker and the others came up with a scheme to under-report taxable income and payroll taxes from $2.1 million in wages from more than 50 Happy's Pizza locations in Michigan, Ohio, Indiana and elsewhere. They were charged with conspiracy to defraud the U.S. government, filing false income tax returns, and corrupt endeavor to obstruct IRS laws. The defendants charged with conspiracy faced up to five years in prison and a $25,000 fine. Those charged with filing false tax returns and obstruction faced to three years in prison and a $250,000 fine on each count. In July 2015, Asker was found guilty on all charges and was sentenced to over four years in prison and ordered to pay $2.5 million in restitution. The other four pleaded guilty. Maher Bashi, the pizza chain's chief operating officer, was sentenced to two years in prison and ordered to pay $620,297. Two franchisees were given prison sentences, while a third received three years probation.

See also
 List of pizza chains of the United States'
 List of pizza franchises

References

External links 

1994 establishments in Michigan
Companies based in Oakland County, Michigan
Economy of the Midwestern United States
Farmington Hills, Michigan
Pizza chains of the United States
Pizza franchises
Regional restaurant chains in the United States
Restaurants in Detroit
Restaurants established in 1994